BENT IMAGE LAB (or BENT) is a production company and animation studio specializing in story development, television, commercials, visual effects, music videos, short films, experimental techniques and tech development in augmented reality (AR). Located in Portland, Oregon, the company was founded in 2002 by partners David Daniels, Ray Di Carlo, and Chel White. 

The studio is known partly for its popular music videos for Thom Yorke, Aesop Rock, They Might Be Giants, Modest Mouse, At the Drive In and David Lynch, as well as commercials for Honda, Nike Inc., Coca-Cola, Starbucks, AT&T, Planters, Unilever, Kelloggs, Hershey’s and the American Indian College Fund. Beginning in 2010, the studio began the production and development of television projects, including half hour animated holiday specials for the Hallmark Channel and animated segments for Portlandia. The company is also known for its visual effects work in motion pictures and television, as seen in Gus Van Sant's Paranoid Park, Restless and Milk, in Todd Haynes' I'm Not There, as well as NBC's Grimm (TV Series). Since 2014, the studio has been developing augmented reality (AR) technology and plans to launch their convergent computer vision library in fall of 2019.

Work and techniques
Bent Image Lab is known largely for its stop motion animation, CGI/computer animation, character design, and multi-technique projects.

Bent's multi-technique approach can be seen in the Modest Mouse music video Whale Song (director Nando Costa), the Thom Yorke music video Harrowdown Hill (director Chel White), the Coca-Cola ad Hidden Formula, the Lux soap ad Provocateur, a commercial for Kellogg's Rice Krispies and a 2017-2019 campaign for Honda which utilizes a mix of live action, puppetry, CGI, and stop motion animation.

One early and notable example of a BENT stop motion project is Blue Christmas (a.k.a. Santa and the States) (season 30, episode 8), a parody short for Robert Smigel's Saturday TV Funhouse on Saturday Night Live. The short, airing December 18, 2004, was directed by Bent co-founder Chel White, written by Robert Smigel and Michelle Saks Smigel with additional material by Rich Blomquist, Stephen Colbert, Scott Jacobson, and Matt O'Brien; voices by Maya Rudolph, Amy Poehler, Erik Bergmann, and Robert Smigel. The short is a parody of the 1964 holiday TV special Rudolph the Red-Nosed Reindeer. Bent Image Lab has replicated the same style and original characters in television advertisements for AT&T, AFLAC, Bing, and in a series of 2014 holiday promos for CBS commemorating the 50th anniversary of Rudolph the Red-Nosed Reindeer. In 2016, the studio produced a ten-minute remake of Rudolph the Red-Nosed Reindeer as a 4D attraction film for SimEx-Iwerks. Another significant stop motion project is Jingle All the Way (TV special), a holiday special for Hallmark Channel. Other notable BENT stop-motion productions include director Rob Shaw's Rats segments for the IFC show Portlandia, and commercials for Legos, Gatorade, Lux, OfficeMax, Kelloggs, Tinactin, and an anti-smoking campaign geared towards children for the Washington Department of Social and Health Services.

BENT's CGI work can be seen in the 2015 Annie Awards nominated Polariffic (director Rob Shaw), as well as in their commercials for Honda, Nike, Coca-Cola, Koodo, Nabisco, Puffs, and the American Lung Association. An example of the studio's hand drawn animation can be seen in the animated sequences of David Oyelowo's feature film, The Water Man (2020).

Founders and directors
Bent Image Lab co-founder and director David Daniels invented an animation technique he termed Strata-cut, a unique form of clay animation in which internally packed "loaves" of clay are animated in thin slices, revealing the movement of the pre-sculpted images within. The technique of strata-cut was first used in Daniels' 1985 short film, Buzz Box, then later in animated segments of the Pee Wee's Playhouse series during the mid-90s, and in the music video for Big Time by Peter Gabriel (1986). In September 2016, Daniels gave a demonstration of his unique Strata-cut technique at the Anthology Film Archives in New York City. Before co-founding Bent Image Lab, David Daniels was a director at the Will Vinton Studios, where he helmed commercial projects for M&M's, Levi's, Fanta and broadcast promos Fox NFL.

Bent co-founder Chel White is an independent director who has been making films since the mid-1980s. His 1991 experimental short film, Choreography for Copy Machine (Photocopy Cha Cha), is widely considered the first film to make use of a technique in which people and objects are animated directly on the glass platen of a photocopy machine. White's other films include the shorts Dirt, Magda and A Painful Glimpse Into My Writing Process (In Less Than 60 Seconds), and the feature film Bucksville. Among White's notable commissioned projects are his 2006 music video Harrowdown Hill for Radiohead lead singer Thom Yorke, which features the first use of the Smallgantics technique, as well as the 2007 short film, Wind, commissioned by Radiohead's creative director Dilly Gent and the climate change awareness group Live Earth. Along with eight other Live Earth commissioned films, Wind made its world premiere in the opening night program of the 2007 Tribeca Film Festival with keynote speaker Al Gore. Since 1999, three of Chel White's short films have screened as part of the Sundance Film Festival (Dirt, Choreography for Copy Machine (Photocopy Cha Cha), and Passage). His other festival screenings include the Berlinale, SXSW, Ottawa Animation Festival, Annecy Animation Festival and the Hong Kong International Film Festival.

Bent Image Lab co-founder and executive producer Ray Di Carlo got his start in the film industry working on special effects in feature films. His first project was The Abyss (1989), where he came on as Lead Man for Donald Pennington. Di Carlo produced visual effects for I'm Not There, Paranoid Park (2007), and Milk (2008). He has been Executive Producer for Bent Image Lab since its inception. Along with Bent Image Lab co-founder David Daniels, Di Carlo has spearheaded the studio's augmented reality (AR) division.

Bent director Rob Shaw is known for his innovative music videos and the ability to mix different forms of media such as stop motion animation, CG, live action and 2-dimensional animation. He has directed several animated television shorts for IFC's Portlandia, television specials for Hallmark, and commercial campaigns for Gatorade, Koodo Mobile, and Kellogg's, as well as music videos for They Might Be Giants, At the Drive In and several videos for Aesop Rock (including the song Rings).  Shaw's animated short film, The Machine, a modern-day cautionary fable about humans and machines, won Best Animated Short from the 2010 Atlanta Film Festival.

Bent director Solomon Burbridge's work includes short, mature-themed segments for MTV, the Bacon Wars segment on Netflix's Disjointed series, and commercials for Old Navy, Tums, MasterCard, Arrowhead and U.S. Navy. He has been a director at BENT since 2007. His film Phase 5 screened in the 2004 Sundance Film Festival. Using the title Design Lab, Burbridge has often co-directed projects with director/designer Joshua Cox, who joined Bent in 2010. Their commercial clients include Honda, Bogs, Cartoon Network and a film for the Advertising and Design Club of Canada called The No Shit Show. Joshua Cox's short film Proximity was winner of the Animation Award in the 2014 New Orleans Film Festival.

Argentine-born director Carlos Lascano is an accomplished filmmaker known for his short films, music videos, and commercials. His work includes a noteworthy ad for Coca-Cola Spirit of the Euro produced at Bent Image Lab, the studio where Carlos Lascano is represented for commercials in North America. One of Lascano's characteristic techniques makes use of real actors' eyes, captured in live action, then digitally composited onto animated characters, as seen his short films Shadow of Blue and A Short Love Story in Stop Motion, as well as several of his commercials.

Bent Image Lab and/or its directors have won awards from the Clio Awards, The One Club, D&AD, Promax BDA awards, Cannes Lions, Daytime Emmy Awards, and several awards from the Chicago International Television Awards. Two commercials directed by Chel White (OfficeMax Santa's Helper, and Fila Mash) were included in the program The Art and Technique of the American Television Commercial The AICP Show at MoMA and are included in the permanent collection of the Museum of Modern Art in New York. Film festival awards include 'Best Television Program for Adults' from the 2012 Ottawa International Animation Festival for Bent Image Lab director Rob Shaw's Rats (stop-motion segments for the IFC show Portlandia), Best Short Film from the 1998 Stockholm International Film Festival for Chel White's Dirt, Best Animated Short for Rob Shaw's The Machine from the 2010 Atlanta Film Festival, and the Grand Jury Prize for Best Animated Short for White's Magda from the 2004 Florida Film Festival. Chel White's music video Harrowdown Hill for Radiohead's lead singer Thom Yorke won Best Music Video in the 2007 SXSW.

Visual effects

Since 2006, Bent Image Lab has created visual effects for feature films, television and more. The company was in charge of visual effects for film director Gus Van Sant's films Paranoid Park (2007), To Each His Own Cinema (segment: First Kiss)" (2007), Restless, and the Academy Award winning Milk (2008), as well as title effects and animation on director Todd Haynes' film, I'm Not There (2007). Chel White acted as Visual Effects Supervisor on all four Van Sant films. For its first two seasons, Bent produced visual effects for NBC's Grimm (TV Series). In 2006, along with his team and co-founders at Bent Image Lab, Chel White pioneered the Smallgantics technique that was used for the first time in the music video he directed for Thom Yorke's song Harrowdown Hill. An incarnation of Smallgantics was also used in the Bent production of Hidden Formula, a commercial for Coca-Cola, directed by David Daniels and Ray Di Carlo).

Augmented reality

In 2014, Bent Image Lab founded YOUar, an internal group of engineers and developers dedicated to providing software for the production and distribution of AR applications, spatial maps and the AR Cloud. Their AR offerings include a convergent computer vision library, a relocalization service for globally positioning mobile devices, and a universal spatial browser for AR content. In spring 2018, YOUar was a founding member of the Open AR Cloud, a standards group dedicated to promoting an open and interoperable AR ecosystem. YOUar has 2 patents awarded regarding AR technology; Accurate Positioning of Augmented Reality Content, and Planet-Scale Positioning of Augmented Reality Content, with a further 6 applications pending.

Creative work

Television, films, and online programs 
Sesame Street Witch Sisters (2018)
Netflix Disjointed "Bacon Wars" fridge segment (2017) (directed by Solomon Burbridge)
IFC Portlandia "Rats" and other animated segments (2011-2017) (directed by Rob Shaw)
Hallmark Channel Polariffic (2014) (directed by Rob Shaw)
Hallmark Channel Jingle & Bell's Christmas Star (2012) (directed by Chel White)
Hallmark Channel Hoops+Yoyo's Haunted Halloween (2012) (directed by Rob Shaw)
Hallmark Channel Jingle All the Way (TV special) (2011) (directed by Chel White)
Saturday Night Live Saturday TV Funhouse "Blue Christmas" (a.k.a. "Santa and the States)" (2004) (directed by Chel White)

Music video 
At The Drive In Hostage Stamps and Call Broken Arrow (2017) (directed by Rob Shaw)
Aesop Rock Rings and Shrunk (2016) (directed by Rob Shaw)
Starfucker Beach Monster (2013) and Bury Us Alive (2012) (directed by Joshua Cox)
The Uncluded Organs and The Aquarium (2013) (directed by Rob Shaw)
Chrysta Bell and David Lynch – Bird of Flames (2012) (directed by Chel White)
LCD Soundsystem Drunk Girls: Holy Ghost Remix (2010) (directed by Daniel Garcia)
They Might Be Giants Computer Assisted Design (2010) (directed by Rob Shaw)
Ash Space Shot (2010) (directed by Daniel Garcia)
Modest Mouse The Whale Song (2009) (directed by Nando Costa)
Ash True Love 1980 (2009) (directed by Daniel Garcia)
They Might Be Giants I'm Impressed (2007) (directed by Rob Shaw)
Thom Yorke Harrowdown Hill. (2006) (directed by Chel White)
The Apparitions God Monkey Robot (2006) (directed by Rob Shaw)

Commercials 
Ad Council/ 211.org - Guiding Light (2021)
Planters - Nuttiest Time of the Year (directed by Chel White) (2020)
Bogs Footwear - Test Machine (directed by Solomon Burbridge and Joshua Cox) (2019)
American Lung Association - Saved By The Scan (directed by Adam Floeck) (2019)
Dairy Farmers of Canada - Merry Christmas (directed by Rob Shaw) (2017)
Yellow Pages - Dine campaign (directed by Rob Shaw) (2017)
Honda - Utility (directed by Joshua Cox) (2017)
American Indian College Fund - One Percent (directed by Chel White) (2015)
Oatmeal Crisp - One Upmanship (directed by Solomon Burbridge) (2015)
AT&T - Rudolph campaign (directed by Chel White) (2015)
Gatorade - Recover campaign (directed by Rob Shaw) (2015)
Nike - Always Advance (directed by Chel White and Joshua Cox) (2014)
Koodo - El Tabador campaign (over 30 spots directed by Rob Shaw, with a few co-directed with Solomon Burbridge) (2009-2014)
Arrowhead - Recycling Is a Beautiful Thing (directed by Solomon Burbridge) (2013)
Starbucks - Summer campaign (directed by Chel White and Marcus Swanson) (2013)
Bing - Rudolph the Red-Nosed Reindeer (directed by Ken Lidster) (2011 Christmas campaign)
Coca-Cola - Spirit of the Euro (directed by Carlos Lascano) (2011)
Coca-Cola - Hidden Formula (directed by David Daniels and Ray Di Carlo) (2008)
BC Dairy Foundation - Must Drink More Milk campaign (web shorts, 2008) (various directors)
Tinactin - Monster Foot (2007–2008) (directed by David Daniels)
Lux - Provocateur (2006) (directed by Chel White and Ray Di Carlo)
Washington State Dept. of Health - Park and Rec Room (2005) (directed by Chel White)
Tractor Supply Company - The Stuff You Need Out Here campaign (2006) (directed by Paul Harrod)
OfficeMax - Santa's Helper (2005) (directed by Chel White)
Reese's Pieces - Center of Attention (2003) (directed by David Daniels and Chel White)

Notable awards and screenings
2018: A Bent Image Lab retrospective and masterclass (presented by Chel White and Rob Shaw) at the Ottawa International Animation Festival. 
2015: Promax BDA awards, Art Direction and Design: Program Bumper, Cartoon Network "Over the Garden Wall", directed by Solomon Burbridge. 
2014: Ottawa Animation Festival, Best Cartoon for Adults, IFC's Portlandia "Rats" segment, directed by Rob Shaw
2007: SXSW, Best Music Video, Thom Yorke, Harrowdown Hill, directed by Chel White.
2006: The AICP Show at MoMA, Office Max Santa's Helper, included in the program The Art and Technique of the American Television Commercial and in the permanent collection of the Museum of Modern Art in New York. Directed by Chel White. 
2005: Florida Film Festival, Grand Jury Award for Best Animated Short, Magda, directed by Chel White. 
2004: Clio Awards, Bronze, Reese's Pieces Center of Attention, directed by David Daniels and Chel White

External links

References

Television production companies of the United States
Film production companies of the United States
American animation studios
Companies based in Portland, Oregon
Mass media companies established in 2002
Privately held companies based in Oregon
2002 establishments in Oregon